James Ralph Kirk (14 November 1895 – 6 November 1963) was a Liberal party member of the House of Commons of Canada. He was born in Antigonish, Nova Scotia and became a merchant by career.

Kirk was first elected to Parliament at the Antigonish—Guysborough riding in a by-election on 16 March 1936 then re-elected for full terms there in 1940, 1945, 1949 and 1953. Kirk was defeated in the 1957 election by Angus Ronald Macdonald of the Progressive Conservative party.

External links
 

1895 births
1963 deaths
Canadian merchants
Liberal Party of Canada MPs
Members of the House of Commons of Canada from Nova Scotia
People from Antigonish, Nova Scotia